Nihei (written: 二瓶 or 弐瓶) is a Japanese surname. Notable people with the surname include:

, Japanese actor
, Japanese footballer
, Japanese manga artist

Japanese-language surnames